Kukurmunda village near Patnagarh in Bolangir district in the Indian state of Odisha.

References

Villages in Bolangir district